Lewotobi is either a separate Central Malayo-Polynesian language or dialect of Lamaholot of Flores island in Indonesia. It is presented as a separate language by Ethnologue and Grimes (1997). , in his description of Lewotobi, disputes this, classifying it instead as a dialect of Lamaholot.

Notes

References
 

Flores-Lembata languages
Languages of Indonesia